Fluenetil (chemical formula: C16H15FO2) is a chemical compound used in acaricides.

References

Acaricides
Biphenyls
Carboxylate esters
Fluoroethyl esters